Kathrin Zettel (born 5 August 1986) is an Austrian retired World Cup alpine ski racer. She won many races and took a bronze medal in the 2014 Winter Olympics in Sochi. In 2021 she was a partner in a company creating domestic size wind turbines in lower Austria.

Life
Zettel was born in 1986 in Scheibbs, Lower Austria, and from Göstling, she competed primarily in the technical events of Giant slalom and slalom.  Zettel made her World Cup debut in March 2004 and won her first World Cup race in November 2006.

In January 2010, Zettel won both technical events at Maribor, for her first victory in slalom. At the 2014 Winter Olympics in Sochi, she was the bronze medalist in slalom at Rosa Khutor, her first podium since October and just two days after her grandmother died.

After she retired in 2015 she went to live in Styria. She took a share in "Blue Power" a wind turbine company. The turbines are small (1.7 m diameter) and designed to be used by a home owner. Zettel handles the social media for the company.

World Cup results

Season standings

Race victories
9 wins – (7 GS, 2 SL)
50 podiums (21 GS, 24 SL, 5 SC)

World championships

Winter Olympics

References

External links

 
 Kathrin Zettel World Cup standings at the International Ski Federation

 
  
 Austrian Ski team – Kathrin Zettel – 
 Atomic Skis – athletes – Kathrin Zettel

1986 births
Living people
People from Scheibbs District
Austrian female alpine skiers
Alpine skiers at the 2006 Winter Olympics
Alpine skiers at the 2010 Winter Olympics
Alpine skiers at the 2014 Winter Olympics
Olympic alpine skiers of Austria
Olympic bronze medalists for Austria
Medalists at the 2014 Winter Olympics
Olympic medalists in alpine skiing
Sportspeople from Lower Austria
20th-century Austrian women
21st-century Austrian women